In enzymology, an enoyl-[acyl-carrier-protein] reductase (NADPH, A-specific) is an enzyme that catalyzes the chemical reaction

acyl-[acyl-carrier-protein] + NADP+  trans-2,3-dehydroacyl-[acyl-carrier-protein] + NADPH + H+

Thus, the two substrates of this enzyme are [[acyl-[acyl-carrier-protein]]] and NADP+, whereas its 3 products are [[trans-2,3-dehydroacyl-[acyl-carrier-protein]]], NADPH, and H+.

This enzyme belongs to the family of oxidoreductases, to be specific, those acting on the CH-CH group of donor with NAD+ or NADP+ as acceptor.  The systematic name of this enzyme class is acyl-[acyl-carrier-protein]:NADP+ oxidoreductase (A-specific). Other names in common use include acyl-ACP dehydrogenase, enoyl-[acyl carrier protein] (reduced nicotinamide adenine, dinucleotide phosphate) reductase, NADPH 2-enoyl Co A reductase, enoyl-ACp reductase, and enoyl-[acyl-carrier-protein] reductase (NADPH2, A-specific).

References

 

EC 1.3.1
NADPH-dependent enzymes
Enzymes of unknown structure